George Frederick Redvers Caddick (2 March 1900–1984) was an English footballer who played in the Football League for Barnsley and Stockport County.

References

1900 births
1984 deaths
English footballers
Association football midfielders
English Football League players
Everton F.C. players
Stockport County F.C. players
Barnsley F.C. players
Llanelli Town A.F.C. players